The Hackett Creek Bridge is a historic bridge near Hackett, Arkansas, which carries Arkansas Highway 45 across Hackett Creek. The bridge is a three-span concrete structure set on abutments and piers of stone and concrete. The deck is asphalt laid over concrete, and there are simple concrete railings on either side. Built in 1941, it is a well-preserved concrete bridge of the period.

The bridge was listed on the National Register of Historic Places in 1995.

See also
National Register of Historic Places listings in Sebastian County, Arkansas
List of bridges on the National Register of Historic Places in Arkansas

References

Road bridges on the National Register of Historic Places in Arkansas
Bridges completed in 1941
Transportation in Sebastian County, Arkansas
National Register of Historic Places in Sebastian County, Arkansas
Concrete bridges in the United States
1941 establishments in Arkansas